The 2021 Temple Owls football team represented Temple University during the 2021 NCAA Division I FBS football season. The Owls were led by third-year head coach Rod Carey and played their home games at Lincoln Financial Field, competing as a member of the American Athletic Conference (AAC).

Previous season

The Owls finished the 2020 season 1–6, 1–6 in AAC play to finish in tenth place in the conference.

Preseason

American Athletic Conference preseason media poll
The American Athletic Conference preseason media poll was released at the virtual media day held August 4, 2021. Cincinnati, who finished the 2020 season ranked No. 8 nationally, was tabbed as the preseason favorite in the 2021 preseason media poll.

Schedule

Source:

Game summaries

at Rutgers

at Akron

Boston College

Wagner

Memphis

at No. 5 Cincinnati

at South Florida

UCF

at East Carolina

Houston

at Tulsa

Navy

References

Temple
Temple Owls football seasons
Temple Owls football